The Central Directorate of the Judicial Police (DCPJ) is a directorate of the National Police of France with national and territorial responsibility for investigating and fighting serious crime. It was formed in 1907 and subsequently restructured under an ordinance dated 5 August 2009.

Mission and responsibilities
The judicial police in France are responsible for fighting serious crime in France nationwide. The Central Directorate was created in 1966 to oversee it. either with its central services that are of national competence (OCTRIS, OCLCO, SDAT, etc.) or through its regional directorates.

The Directorate is focused on the investigation of organized crime, terrorism, cybercrime, and other serious and complex forms of criminal behaviour in France.

Its responsibilities and focus evolved over time. In 2009, the following were directly mentioned:

 Crimes against persons and properties
 Missing persons
 Arms trafficking
 Fugitives
 International fraud
 Prostitution
 Art trafficking
 Stolen vehicles and documents
 Terrorism
 Drug trafficking
 Money laundering
 White-collar crime
 Counterfeiting
 Cybercrime

Organisation
The DCPJ is itself divided into sub-directorates:
 The sous-direction de la lutte contre la criminalité organisée et la délinquance financière (SDLCODF) – Organised and financial crime sub-directorate.
 The sous-direction Anti-terroriste (SDAT) – Anti-terrorist sub-directorate.
 The sous-direction de la lutte contre la cybercriminalité – Cybercrime sub-directorater.
 The sous-direction de la police technique et scientifique (SDPTS) – Police Technical and Scientific sub-directorate.
 The sous-direction des ressources, de l'évaluation et de la stratégie (SDRES) – Resources, evaluations, and strategy sub-directorate.

But a major part of the Police judiciaire (PJ) in France is actually composed by territorial services (DIPJ/DRPJ).

It has a strength of 5,200 employees.

History 

The first national judicial police was created in 1907 by Georges Clemenceau acting as Minister of the Interior, and Célestin Hennion. Before that, the police were local forces, and had trouble coping with new large gangs acting on broader areas, using cars and railways to move (while police had bicycle or horses). The 12 Brigades régionales de police mobile (Regional Brigades of Mobile Police), based in major cities with large jurisdictions, totaled 500 strong (which allowed 24/7 surveillance of suspects), well trained, used the Bertillon system, had telephones and quickly got cars. They got results, such as the arrest of the famous Bonnot Gang. "Le Tigre" (tiger) being the nickname of Georges Clemenceau, they got called Brigades du Tigre (Tiger Squad) and were featured in Les Brigades du Tigre. Nowadays the logo of the DCPJ figures a tiger and the silhouette of Clemenceau.

See also
 French National Police
 Direction Régionale de Police Judiciaire de Paris

References

National Police (France)
Police headquarters